Marqués de la Valdavia is a station on Line 10 of the Madrid Metro. It is located in fare Zone B1.

References 

Line 10 (Madrid Metro) stations
Railway stations in Spain opened in 2007
Alcobendas